HMS Shoulton (M1182) was a  of the Royal Navy. Constructed by the Montrose Shipyard in  Montrose, Scotland and launched on 10 September 1954, the minesweeper was converted into a prototype minhunter in 1957. The vessel was used as a test bed in the mid-1960s for new propulsion technologies. Shoulton was among the vessels assigned to salvage operations following the Aer Lingus Flight 712 crash off Rosslare. In 1977, Shoulton took part in the naval review marking the Silver Jubilee of Elizabeth II and was paid off on 23 November 1979. The ship was sold for scrap in 1981 and broken up at broken up in Blyth.

Construction and design
Shoulton was ordered on 17 June 1952 and was launched at Montrose Shipyard, Montrose, Scotland on 10 September 1954. She was completed on 16 November 1955, commissioning with the pennant number M1182.

Like all the Ton class, the ship had an aluminium-framed wooden hull.

Armament consisted of a single Bofors 40 mm anti-aircraft gun forward and two Oerlikon 20 mm cannon aft. Minesweeping equipment included wire sweeps for sweeping moored contact mines and acoustic or magnetic sweeps for dealing with influence mines. Unlike earlier ships of the class, Shoulton was fitted with an enclosed bridge.

Service
In 1957, Shouton was converted into a prototype minehunter by Vosper Thornycroft at their Woolston, Southampton works. In November 1960, Shouton was part of the 50th Mine Sweeping Squadron and in July 1963 joined the First Minesweeping Squadron as the Senior Officer's ship. From 1965 to 1967, Shouton was refitted with a prototype pump-jet propulsor. The installation was successful, proving resistant to damage (managing to survive a railway sleeper entering the pump-jet without damage to the propulsor), and paved the way for pump-jets being used on the Royal Navy's nuclear submarines.

On 28 July 1977, Shoulton took part in the Review of the Fleet at Spithead commemorating the Silver Jubilee of Elizabeth II as part of the 3rd Mine Countermeasures Squadron (3rd MCMS). She transferred to the 2nd Mine Countermeasures Squadron (2 MCMS) in January 1979 and paid off for the last time at Portsmouth on 23 November 1979.

Shoulton was sold for scrapping on 2 February 1981 and was broken up in Blyth from 17 April 1981.

Notes

Citations

References
 
 
 
 
 

 

Ton-class minesweepers of the Royal Navy
Ships built in Scotland
1954 ships
Cold War minesweepers of the United Kingdom